The following lists events that happened during 1946 in New Zealand.

Population
 Estimated population as of 31 December: 1,781,200
 Increase since 31 December 1945: 53,400 (3.09%)
 Males per 100 females: 100.2

Incumbents

Regal and viceregal
Head of State – George VI
Governor-General – Marshal of the Royal Air Force Sir Cyril Newall GCB OM GCMG CBE AM, succeeded same year by Lieutenant-General The Lord Freyberg VC GCMG KCB KBE DSO

Government
The 27th New Zealand Parliament concluded, with the Labour Party in government. Labour was re-elected for a fourth term in the election in November, but with a smaller majority.

Speaker of the House – Bill Schramm (Labour)
Prime Minister – Peter Fraser
Minister of Finance – Walter Nash
Minister of Foreign Affairs – Peter Fraser
Attorney-General – Rex Mason
Chief Justice – Sir Michael Myers (until 7 August),  Sir Humphrey O'Leary (starting 12 August)

Parliamentary opposition 
 Leader of the Opposition –  Sidney Holland (National Party).

Main centre leaders
Mayor of Auckland – John Allum
Mayor of Hamilton – Harold Caro
Mayor of Wellington – Will Appleton
Mayor of Christchurch – Ernest Andrews
Mayor of Dunedin – Donald Cameron

Events 

 Family benefit of £1 per week becomes universal.
 Bank of New Zealand nationalised.

Arts and literature

See 1946 in art, 1946 in literature

Music

See: 1946 in music

Radio

See: Public broadcasting in New Zealand

Film

See: :Category:1946 film awards, 1946 in film, List of New Zealand feature films, Cinema of New Zealand, :Category:1946 films

Sport

Archery
National Champions (Postal Shoot) 
Open: W. Burton (Gisborne)
Women: P. Bryan (Auckland)

Athletics
 Lionel Fox wins his second national title in the men's marathon, clocking 2:40:00 in Wanganui.

Basketball
National Associations are formed for both men and women (now combined as Basketball New Zealand) and the first championship for men under the control of their association is held. (see 1938 and 1939)

 Interprovincial champions: Men – (tie) Auckland, Wellington, Otago

Chess
 The 53rd National Chess Championship was held in Christchurch, and was won by T. Lepviikman of Wellington.

Cricket

Horse racing

Harness racing
 New Zealand Trotting Cup – Integrity
 Auckland Trotting Cup – Loyal Nurse

Lawn bowls
The national outdoor lawn bowls championships are held in Christchurch.
 Men's singles champion – J.S. Martin (Edgeware Bowling Club)
 Men's pair champions – G.C. Batchelor, S.C.K. Smith (skip) (North End Bowling Club, Invercargill)
 Men's fours champions – W. Hillhouse, J. Gourley, J. Armstrong, F. White (skip) (Runanga Bowling Club)

Rugby union
:Category:Rugby union in New Zealand, :Category:All Blacks
 Ranfurly Shield

Rugby league
New Zealand national rugby league team

Soccer
 14 September: A New Zealand team played a single game against Wellington, which they won 5–2
 The Chatham Cup is won by Wellington Marist who beat Technical Old Boys of Christchurch 2–1 in the final.
 Provincial league champions: 
	Auckland:	Metro College
	Canterbury:	Western
	Hawke's Bay:	Napier Rovers
	Nelson:
	Otago:	Mosgiel
	South Canterbury:	Fisherman
	Southland:	Invercargill Thistle
	Taranaki:	Albion
	Waikato:	Rotowaro
	Wanganui:	Technical College Old Boys
	Wellington:	Wellington Marist

Births
 25 February: Grahame Thorne, rugby player, commentator and politician.
 28 February: Graham Vivian, cricketer.
 2 April: Richard Collinge, cricketer.
 15 May: George Hawkins, politician.
 24 May: Ian Kirkpatrick, rugby player.
 5 June (in Wales): John Bach, actor.
 8 June: Graham Henry, rugby coach.
 27 June: Bruce Cribb, motorcycle speedway rider.
 4 July: Sam Hunt, performance poet.
 22 July: Christine McElwee, politician, historian, non-fiction author and teacher (died 2022).
 4 August: Paul East, politician.
 1 September: Keith Quinn, broadcaster.
 14 September: John Luxton, politician.
 29 September: Neil Cherry, environmental scientist (died 2003).
 17 October: Ian Wedde, writer.
 30 November: Ken Wadsworth, cricketer (died 1976).
 2 December: 
John Banks, politician, radio host.
Doug Cowie, cricket umpire.
 11 December: Stewart Murray Wilson, sex offender (died 2021).
 27 December: Bill Manhire, poet.
date unknown
 Frank Gibson, Jr., jazz drummer.
 Richard Killeen, artist.

Deaths
 9 February Vincent Ward, politician.
 5 March: Sir Charles Statham, politician.
 26 September: William Nosworthy, politician.
 10 November: Claude Weston, politician.

See also
List of years in New Zealand
Timeline of New Zealand history
History of New Zealand
Military history of New Zealand
Timeline of the New Zealand environment
Timeline of New Zealand's links with Antarctica

References

External links

 
Years of the 20th century in New Zealand